Chael Patrick Sonnen (born April 3, 1977) is an American submission grappling promoter, mixed martial arts (MMA) analyst, and retired mixed martial artist. Beginning his MMA career in 1997, Sonnen competed for the Ultimate Fighting Championship (UFC), where he became a top contender in both the light heavyweight and middleweight divisions and challenged for both the UFC Light Heavyweight and UFC Middleweight Championships. Sonnen has also fought in World Extreme Cagefighting, Pancrase, and most recently for Bellator MMA. Sonnen is often considered one of the best mixed martial artists never to have won a major MMA world championship and one of the sport's greatest trash-talkers. 

In 2014, Sonnen began working as a MMA analyst for ESPN and two years later, in July 2016, founded Submission Underground (SUG), his own submission grappling promotion.

Early life 
Sonnen was born in either Milwaukie, Oregon, or West Linn, Oregon (sources differ), and began wrestling at the age of nine. He attended West Linn High School, where he was a state runner-up. In 1996, Sonnen began training in boxing, with the hope of competing in the UFC upon graduating from high school.

After high school, Sonnen attended Brigham Young University before transferring to the University of Oregon in Eugene, when BYU began considering cutting their wrestling program. At Oregon, Sonnen earned All-American honors, was a two-time PAC-10 runner-up, was a silver medalist at the 2000 Greco-Roman World University Championships, and was a two-time Dave Schultz Memorial International Greco-Roman winner. He graduated from the University of Oregon in 2001, with a Bachelor of Science degree in sociology.

A lifelong fan, Sonnen had an interest in pursuing a career in professional wrestling, and he attended a try out for World Championship Wrestling at the WCW Power Plant in the summer of 1998.

Mixed martial arts career

Early career 
Sonnen started his mixed martial arts career in 1997 at the age of 19, by defeating Ben Hailey in Vancouver, Washington. He next defeated future ICON Sport Middleweight Champion and Strikeforce Middleweight contender Jason "Mayhem" Miller. He won his first six fights, before losing to Trevor Prangley. In late 2003, he was submitted by future Ultimate Fighter winner and UFC Light Heavyweight Champion Forrest Griffin with a triangle choke submission.

Ultimate Fighting Championship 
Sonnen made his UFC debut in a Light Heavyweight bout against former IFC Light Heavyweight Champion Renato Sobral at UFC 55, submitting to a second-round triangle choke. He then avenged his first loss, by winning a unanimous decision over Trevor Prangley at UFC Ultimate Fight Night 4. At UFC 60, he fought Jeremy Horn for the third time and submitted to an armbar. Shortly after, he was released from the UFC.

Bodog Fight 
In May 2006, Sonnen debuted for Bodog Fight, defeating Tim Credeur via TKO. He went on to win a unanimous decision over Alexey Oleinik, defeat Tim McKenzie in 13 seconds with a D'arce choke, and finish UFC and PRIDE veteran Amar Suloev via TKO. After leaving Bodog, Sonnen defeated future Ultimate Fighter member Kyacey Uscola at SuperFight 20: Homecoming.

World Extreme Cagefighting 
In December 2007, Sonnen fought Paulo Filho for the WEC Middleweight Championship. Sonnen lost via a controversial submission at 4:55 of the second round. Sonnen did not tap out but screamed in pain, which the referee interpreted as a verbal submission. In his post-fight interview, Sonnen said he told the referee not to stop the fight, and continually said "No" when the referee asked if he wanted to submit. Keith Kizer, executive director of the Nevada State Athletic Commission, claimed Sonnen only yelled "No" after the referee stopped the fight. Kizer and Dana White (who was watching ringside) both agreed with the call.

A rematch was scheduled for March 26, 2008, but was cancelled after Filho entered a drug rehabilitation program. Sonnen instead faced undefeated contender Bryan Baker and dominated him for three rounds to win a unanimous decision (30–26, 30–25, and 30–25). Sonnen and Filho eventually met again on November 5, 2008. Filho appeared distracted through out the bout, and Sonnen took advantage winning all three rounds to win the fight via uanimous decision. Prior to the fight, Filho weighed in almost seven pounds over the 185-pound limit, so the bout was ruled a non-title match. After Filho lost, he announced he would ship Sonnen the championship belt.

Return to the UFC 
Following the dissolution of WEC's middleweight division, Sonnen returned to the UFC.

In his first fight for the promotion since UFC 60, he was submitted by jiu-jitsu ace Demian Maia via triangle choke submission at UFC 95.

At UFC 98 in May 2009, Sonnen defeated Dan Miller via unanimous decision. He was a late replacement for Yushin Okami, who tore ligament while training. He took the fight on 22 days' notice, and lost  in order to compete.

In his next fight, at UFC 104, Sonnen outwrestled Okami for a unanimous decision victory.

Sonnen was expected to face Nate Marquardt at UFC 110, but the fight was moved to UFC 109 on February 6. Sonnen won a unanimous decision, after escaping two deep guillotine chokes in the first and third rounds. With the victory, Sonnen became the number one contender for the UFC Middleweight Championship.

Silva vs. Sonnen 
At UFC 117 on August 7, 2010, Sonnen challenged Anderson Silva for the UFC Middleweight Championship. Sonnen had trash talked to hype the fight, stating he was going to retire Silva. Sonnen put on a dominant performance, stunning Silva early with his boxing, and then dominating the fight with his wrestling, heading into the fifth round, Sonnen was ahead on the judges' scorecards (40–34, 40–36, and 40–35). At 3:10 into the final round, Silva caught Sonnen in a triangle armbar and made him tap out. In a later interview, Sonnen stated it was the choke, not the armbar, that made him submit. The fight earned both fighters Fight of the Night honors, and was considered to be the best fight of the year by many critics. The fight was later awarded 'Fight of the Year' by World MMA Awards.

CSAC suspensions and appeals 
Urinalysis conducted after his loss to Anderson Silva showed Sonnen had an unallowably high testosterone/epitestosterone (T/E) ratio of 16.9:1 at the time of the fight. An average man has a T/E ratio of 1:1, and testing bodies may allow a ratio as high as 4:1 for athletes undergoing TRT treatment. In other words, Sonnen's T/E ratio was nearly 17 times than a normal man's and over four times the allowed maximum for an athlete. He was fined $2,500 and suspended for one year (until September 2, 2011) by the California State Athletic Commission (CSAC). His scheduled rematch with Silva was subsequently cancelled.

Initial appeal 
Sonnen appealed the CSAC's decision. The hearing was held on December 2, 2010. The principal grounds of his appeal were that he had a medical justification for taking testosterone, and he believed he had taken the necessary steps to disclose the condition and its treatment to the CSAC. He testified he had been diagnosed with hypogonadism in 2008 and was undergoing testosterone replacement therapy (TRT), self-injecting synthetic testosterone two times a week. Sonnen's physician, Dr. Mark Czarnecki, was present at the hearing and attested to these claims.

In his sworn testimony, Sonnen claimed to have been previously approved for TRT by the Nevada State Athletic Commission (NSAC), and to have spoken directly to NSAC's Executive Director, Keith Kizer, who informed him he was approved for TRT and should not again disclose the treatment on the pre-bout medical disclosure statements required by the NSAC. He said he believed this advice about disclosure also applied to the forms of other state athletic commissions. He said he had previously disclosed his condition to the CSAC before his UFC 104 bout with Yushin Okami, which took place in Los Angeles on October 24, 2009. Based on his testimony, the CSAC voted to recharacterize Sonnen's transgression as a failure to properly disclose a medical treatment, and correspondingly reduced his suspension from twelve months to six, ending March 2, 2011.

Keith Kizer publicly responded to Sonnen's testimony, claiming the NSAC had never approved Sonnen for TRT, Sonnen had never applied for the approval process, and he had "never talked to Chael Sonnen in [his] life." At a subsequent meeting between the UFC, Sonnen and the NSAC, Kizer asked Sonnen about his testimony at the December 2, 2010, CSAC hearing. According to Kizer, Sonnen initially deflected his questions but, when pressed further, admitted no conversation between Kizer and himself had occurred. Sonnen explained "My manager and you talked about therapeutic exemptions, and therefore, I just used the wrong word. I should have said 'my' instead of 'I.' As in 'my manager' instead of 'I'". Kizer called this a "strange story" and a "ridiculous explanation" Kizer acknowledged speaking with Sonnen's manager (Matt Lindland) about TRT, but said the conversation concerned only the procedure itself, not the application of any particular fighter.

CSAC Executive Director George Dodd has also contradicted Sonnen's testimony, stating the CSAC has no documentary evidence of Sonnen ever being approved for TRT.

Subsequent suspension by CSAC 
Sonnen's abbreviated CSAC suspension expired on March 2, 2011. However, in the third week of April 2011, the CSAC announced it had reversed its decision to lower his sentence, and had placed him on indefinite administrative suspension due to his conviction for money laundering (see below) and his possibly false testimony during the hearing of December 2, 2010. Sonnen appeared before the CSAC on May 18, 2011, requesting the suspension be lifted. After hearing testimony from Keith Kizer via streaming video, as well as from Sonnen and his supporters, the CSAC voted 4–1 to uphold the suspension. Two days later, the CSAC clarified that the applicable regulations only allowed Sonnen to be suspended until his existing license expired (on June 29, 2011). If Sonnen applied for a new license after June 29, 2011, he would have to reappear before the CSAC, which could deny the application.

Second return to the UFC 
After his suspension, Sonnen returned to the UFC on October 8, 2011, defeating Brian Stann with a second round arm triangle choke at UFC 136.

Sonnen was expected to face Mark Muñoz on January at UFC on Fox 2, but Muñoz was injured and replaced by Michael Bisping. Sonnen was awarded the unanimous decision (30–27, 29–28, and 29–28) victory after three rounds.

Silva vs. Sonnen II 
A rematch with Anderson Silva was scheduled UFC 147, but the bout was moved to UFC 148 on July 7, 2012, after a scheduling conflict with the UN Conference on Sustainable Development forced UFC 147 into a smaller venue. The fight was considered by many analysts and several major media outlets as the most highly anticipated bout in UFC history.

The fight looked to be similar to the first, as Sonnen immediately took down Silva and dominated him with wrestling and ground and pound strikes.
One cageside judge scored it a 10–8 round as Silva was credited with zero strikes. However, Sonnen would be unable to score a takedown in the second round, and attempted a spinning backfist that missed, causing him to lose his balance, with Silva connecting with a knee to the body and finishing Sonnen with punches, losing the fight by TKO in the second round.

Return to light heavyweight 
On August 14, 2012, on UFC Tonight, Sonnen announced he would face Forrest Griffin in a Light Heavyweight rematch on December 29, 2012, at UFC 155. But the rematch with Griffin was scrapped after Sonnen was named as a coach for The Ultimate Fighter 17 against Light Heavyweight Champion Jon Jones.

A bout between Sonnen and Jones for the UFC Light Heavyweight Championship took place on April 27, 2013, at UFC 159. Sonnen originally accepted a fight with Jon Jones for the title at UFC 151, after Jones's original challenger Dan Henderson was injured, but Jones declined. Some fighters were upset with his title opportunity because Sonnen, "arguably the most legendary talker in UFC history", had not fought since returning to the light heavyweight division. Dana White defended the matchup, saying "Sonnen was willing to fly over to Las Vegas to fight Jones on the same day", while other contenders like Maurício Rua and Lyoto Machida turned the offer down.

Jon Jones showed a lack of interest in the fight and downplayed the contest, making it clear that he did not believe Sonnen to be a worthy contender. In an interview, Sonnen did his best to hype up interest but Jones gave him "silent treatment", refusing to make eye contact. Jones dispatched the challenger using Sonnen's own style of dominant top control and ground and pound to defeat him via TKO in the first round. Despite the dominant performance from Jones, Sonnen was likely only 27 seconds away from winning the title, as it was later discovered that, while defending a takedown, Jones suffered a serious toe injury that could have resulted in a doctor's stoppage TKO loss had the bout continued to the second round.

Sonnen was expected to face Maurício Rua on June 15, 2013, at UFC 161, replacing Antônio Rogério Nogueira, who had pulled out of the bout citing a back injury. However, issues relating to obtaining a visa meant Sonnen was not able to get into Canada, and Rua ended up being pulled from the event altogether. The bout with Rua eventually took place on August 17, 2013, at UFC Fight Night 26. Sonnen won via a guillotine choke submission in the first round.

Sonnen faced Rashad Evans on November 16, 2013, at UFC 167. He lost the fight via TKO in the first round.

The Ultimate Fighter: Brazil 3 and failed drug tests 
On October 22, 2013, it was announced that Sonnen would be coaching The Ultimate Fighter: Brazil 3, against long-time rival Wanderlei Silva. A bout with Silva, briefly attached to UFC 173, then at The Ultimate Fighter: Brazil 3 Finale, was expected to take place on July 5, 2014, at UFC 175. Dana White later stated the fight had to be rescheduled because Silva injured his hand from a brawl with Sonnen that took place during the filming of the show. Silva was ultimately pulled from the fight entirely after he failed to submit an application to fight in the state of Nevada, as well as his refusal to undergo a random drug test and was replaced by Vitor Belfort. However, Sonnen subsequently failed his random drug test and was removed from the bout.

First retirement and termination
Following the controversy of his second failed drug test, Sonnen announced on the June 11, 2014, episode of UFC Tonight his retirement from MMA competition.

Subsequent to his retirement, it was revealed on June 28, 2014, by the NSAC that Sonnen had failed a second random drug test—the third failed drug test throughout his MMA career—due to the presence of human growth hormone (HGH), recombinant human erythropoietin (EPO), anastrozole, and human chorionic gonadotropin (hCG).

On June 30, 2014, UFC and Fox Sports announced they had terminated Sonnen's contract as a UFC analyst due to his multiple failed drug tests. On July 23, 2014, the NSAC ruled that Sonnen would be suspended for 2 years from martial arts competition worldwide due to his multiple failed drugs tests.

Bellator MMA 
On September 15, 2016, it was reported that Sonnen had signed a multi-fight contract with Bellator MMA.

Sonnen made his promotional debut in a light heavyweight match against former UFC Light Heavyweight Champion and UFC Hall-of-Famer Tito Ortiz on January 21, 2017, in the main event at Bellator 170. He lost the fight via submission in the first round.

His second promotional fight was a rescheduled match up against Wanderlei Silva on June 24, 2017, in the main event at Bellator NYC. He won the fight via unanimous decision (30–26, 30–27, and 30–27). He got knocked down in the first round but dominated the rest of the fight to guarantee a win over his long-time rival. In his post-fight speech, he called for a bout with heavyweight Fedor Emelianenko, who had lost earlier on the card.

Heavyweight Grand Prix 
Sonnen faced Quinton Jackson for the Bellator Heavyweight World Grand Prix Tournament on January 20, 2018, at Bellator 192. He won the fight via unanimous decision, securing a takedown in each round to establish the win.

Sonnen faced Fedor Emelianenko next in the semifinals of the Bellator Heavyweight Grand Prix tournament on October 13, 2018, at Bellator 208. He lost the fight via TKO in the first round.

Return to light heavyweight and second retirement 
On April 4, 2019, it was announced that Sonnen would face Lyoto Machida on June 14, 2019, at Bellator 222 in Bellator's return to Madison Square Garden. He lost the fight via TKO in the second round. Sonnen announced his retirement from MMA in the post-fight interview.

Analyst career 
On November 11, 2014, ESPN announced it had hired Sonnen as an MMA analyst. He debuted on November 14, previewing UFC 180.

On May 6, 2015, professional wrestling promotion Global Force Wrestling (GFW) announced Sonnen as an "expert analyst" for its future events. On July 24, Sonnen was revealed as part of the announce team for GFW's Amped program.

On September 2, 2015, it was announced that Sonnen signed with the World Series of Fighting to become a member of their broadcast team beginning at WSOF 23.

Upon signing with Bellator MMA in 2016, Sonnen signed as an analyst for Bellator in addition to being a fighter, and he also did commentary on numerous Bellator events.

Political candidacy 
Sonnen ran as the Republican candidate for the 37th district of the Oregon House of Representatives in 2010. That June, he dropped out of the race, referring to a 2006 legal issue involving real estate.

Championships and accomplishments

Amateur wrestling 
 National Collegiate Athletic Association
NCAA Division I All-American out of University of Oregon (1998)
 NCAA Division I 190 lb – 8th place out of University of Oregon (1998)
 Pac-10 Conference 197 lb – 2nd place out of University of Oregon (1999)
 Pac-10 Conference 197 lb – 2nd place out of University of Oregon (2001)
 University National Greco-Roman Championships
 187.25 lb – 3rd place out of University of Oregon (1997)
 187.25 lb – 2nd place out of University of Oregon (1998)
 187.25 lb – 1st place out of University of Oregon (1999)
 187.25 lb – 1st place out of University of Oregon (2000)
 Awarded "Most Outstanding Wrestler" of 2000 tournament
 World University Greco-Roman Championships
 187.25 lb – 2nd place (2000)
 Senior National Greco-Roman Championships
 187.25 lb – 4th place (2000)
 185 lb – 4th place (2002)
 2000 US Greco-Roman Olympic Team Trials
 187.25 lb West Regional Champion
 187.25 lb – 3rd place
  US Greco-Roman World Team Trials
 211.75 lb – 4th place (2002)
 Dave Schultz Memorial International Greco-Roman
 187.25 lb – 1st place (2000)
 213.75 lb – 1st place (2001)
 University National Freestyle Championships
 187.25 lb – 5th place out of University of Oregon (1998)
 187.25 lb – 3rd place out of University of Oregon (1999)
 187.25 lb – 2nd place out of University of Oregon (2000)
 Championship Belt Series Winner, University Level (2000)

Mixed martial arts 
 Ultimate Fighting Championship
Fight of the Night (Two times) vs. Nate Marquardt and Anderson Silva
 Submission of the Night (One time) vs. Maurício Rua
 Bellator MMA
Bellator Heavyweight Grand Prix Semifinalist
 DangerZone
 DangerZone Light Heavyweight Championship (One time)
 DangerZone Light Heavyweight Tournament Winner
 George Tragos/Lou Thesz Professional Wrestling Hall of Fame
 George Tragos Award (2016)
 Gladiator Challenge
 Gladiator Challenge Light Heavyweight Championship (One time)
 Hitman Fighting Productions
 Hitman Light Heavyweight Championship (One time)
 World MMA Awards
 2010 Fight of the Year vs. Anderson Silva at UFC 117
 2013 Personality of the Year
 Wrestling Observer Newsletter awards
 Best on Interviews (2010)

Personal life 
Sonnen is of German heritage, and is a Catholic.

Sonnen is married to Brittany; their wedding was in July 2013. The couple had their first child, a son named Thero, on June 4, 2015. On the next episode of his podcast, he said that he had never understood parents who describe something as mundane as birth as a miracle, but that now he understood. He also said, "I love hearing him scream. People get upset when their baby cries, man, I've waited a long time to hear that cry, I've got no problem with it. In my house, we understand, if you want to be heard, you gotta make a little noise." In 2016, Chael's newborn daughter, Blauna Dian, died. Both Blauna Dian and Chael's wife, Brittany, had contracted listeria.

On May 5, 2013, Sonnen announced he would like to buy WWE (then valued at roughly $700 million) after he retires. Though his representative insisted he was not joking, a WWE representative said it was not for sale, and suggested Sonnen purchase stock in the company instead.

Controversies and legal troubles

2011: Money laundering 
Sonnen is a licensed realtor in Oregon. In 2006, as the agent for a home sale, he told the title company to pay a plumbing company owned by Sonnen's mother for repairs, though he knew they would not be carried out. After the mortgage company agreed to the loan, the plumbing company was paid $69,000 and, at Sonnen's direction, paid the home buyer $65,000. On January 3, 2011, he pleaded guilty to money laundering in connection with mortgage fraud. After agreeing to testify against others involved in the investigation, Sonnen was fined $10,000 and sentenced to two years' probation.

2012: Embezzlement lawsuit
In 2012, Sonnen started Mean Streets Pizza with business partner Lee Gamble in West Linn, Oregon. In February 2013 Sonnen sued his business partner for embezzlement and unpaid rent. Gamble filed a counter lawsuit seeking $400,000 in damages from Sonnen for defamation, wage reimbursement, and his ownership interest in the business. The case was settled out of court and did not go to trial. Sonnen sold Mean Streets Pizza in 2014 to new management and it was renamed Island Sam's Pizza.

2021: Altercation at Luxor Hotel
In December 2021, Sonnen was charged with five counts of misdemeanor battery after an alleged altercation at a Luxor Hotel and Casino  hotel in Las Vegas. Witnesses reported seeing Sonnen loudly banging on a hotel room door at around 7:00 PM PST. When the door opened, Sonnen allegedly got into a physical altercation with multiple people, prompting hotel guests to call 911. Video footage showed Sonnen in handcuffs being walked down a hotel hallway by Las Vegas police officers, but Sonnen was not arrested, only detained and later given citations for the charges. On January 27, 2022, all charges against Sonnen were dropped without prejudice.
 However, on March 22, 2022, the district attorney, who had the power to charge Sonnen again with new information, charged Sonnen with one felony battery by strangulation charge, along with 10 misdemeanor battery charges, including alleged choking of one person, possible striking of a female among others. Sonnen initially faced five misdemeanor battery charges by five different people but the charges were dismissed at court. On March 30, 2022, Sonnen's charges were reduced to six misdemeanors  and the trial is set to begin on April 5, 2023 after Sonnen rejected a plea deal offered by prosecutors on four misdemeanor battery charges.

Film and television appearances 
Sonnen has appeared in the following films:
 Here Comes the Boom (2012)
 Grudge Match (2013)

In 2017, he appeared on The New Celebrity Apprentice, the 8th season of reality game show The Celebrity Apprentice. He was fired by host Arnold Schwarzenegger in the show's 4th week after it emerged that he had deliberately cut his team's computer cord in order to gain them more time.

Mixed martial arts record 

|-
|Loss
|align=center|31–17–1
|Lyoto Machida
|TKO (flying knee and punches)
|Bellator 222
|
|align=center|2
|align=center|0:22
|New York City, New York, United States
|
|-
|  Loss
| align=center| 31–16–1
| Fedor Emelianenko
| TKO (punches)
| Bellator 208
| 
| align=center| 1
| align=center| 4:46
| Uniondale, New York, United States
| 
|-
|Win
|align=center|31–15–1
|Quinton Jackson
|Decision (unanimous)
|Bellator 192
|
|align=center|3
|align=center|5:00
|Inglewood, California, United States
|
|-
|Win
|align=center|30–15–1
|Wanderlei Silva
|Decision (unanimous)
|Bellator 180
|
|align=center|3
|align=center|5:00
|New York City, New York, United States
|
|-
|  Loss
| align=center | 29–15–1
| Tito Ortiz
| Submission (rear-naked choke)
| Bellator 170
| 
| align=center | 1
| align=center | 2:03
| Inglewood, California, United States
|
|-
|  Loss
| align=center | 29–14–1
| Rashad Evans
| TKO (punches)
| UFC 167
| 
| align=center | 1
| align=center | 4:05
| Las Vegas, Nevada, United States
|
|-
|  Win
| align=center | 29–13–1
| Maurício Rua
| Submission (guillotine choke)
| UFC Fight Night: Shogun vs. Sonnen
| 
| align=center | 1
| align=center | 4:47
| Boston, Massachusetts, United States
| 
|-
|  Loss
| align=center | 28–13–1
| Jon Jones
| TKO (elbows and punches)
| UFC 159
| 
| align=center | 1
| align=center | 4:33
| Newark, New Jersey, United States
| 
|-
|  Loss
| align=center | 28–12–1
| Anderson Silva
| TKO (knee to the body and punches)
| UFC 148
| 
| align=center | 2
| align=center | 1:55
| Las Vegas, Nevada, United States
| 
|-
|  Win
| align=center | 28–11–1
| Michael Bisping
| Decision (unanimous)
| UFC on Fox: Evans vs. Davis
| 
| align=center | 3
| align=center | 5:00
| Chicago, Illinois, United States
| 
|-
|  Win
| align=center | 27–11–1
| Brian Stann
| Submission (arm-triangle choke)
| UFC 136
| 
| align=center | 2
| align=center | 3:51
| Houston, Texas, United States
|
|-
| Loss
| align=center | 26–11–1
| Anderson Silva
| Submission (triangle armbar)
| UFC 117
| 
| style="text-align:center;" | 5
| style="text-align:center;" | 3:10
| Oakland, California, United States
| 
|-
| Win
| align=center | 26–10–1
| Nate Marquardt
| Decision (unanimous)
| UFC 109
| 
| align=center | 3
| align=center | 5:00
| Las Vegas, Nevada, United States
| 
|-
| Win
| align=center | 25–10–1
| Yushin Okami
| Decision (unanimous)
| UFC 104
| 
| align=center | 3
| align=center | 5:00
| Los Angeles, California, United States
|
|-
| Win
| align=center | 24–10–1
| Dan Miller
| Decision (unanimous)
| UFC 98
| 
| align=center | 3
| align=center | 5:00
| Las Vegas, Nevada, United States
|
|-
| Loss
| align=center | 
| Demian Maia
| Submission (triangle choke)
| UFC 95
| 
| align=center | 1
| align=center | 2:37
| London, United Kingdom
|
|-
| Win
| align=center | 23–9–1
| Paulo Filho
| Decision (unanimous)
| WEC 36
| 
| align=center | 3
| align=center | 5:00
| Hollywood, Florida, United States
| 
|-
| Win
| align=center | 22–9–1
| Bryan Baker
| Decision (unanimous)
| WEC 33
| 
| align=center | 3
| align=center | 5:00
| Las Vegas, Nevada, United States
|
|-
| Loss
| align=center | 21–9–1
| Paulo Filho
| Submission (armbar)
| WEC 31
| 
| align=center | 2
| align=center | 4:55
| Las Vegas, Nevada, United States
| 
|-
| Win
| align=center | 21–8–1
| Kyacey Uscola
| TKO (punches)
| SF 20: Homecoming
| 
| align=center | 1
| style="text-align:center;" | 4:31
| Portland, Oregon, United States
|
|-
| Win
| align=center | 20–8–1
| Amar Suloev
| TKO (punches)
| BodogFIGHT: Alvarez vs. Lee
| 
| align=center | 2
| align=center | 3:33
| Trenton, New Jersey, United States
|
|-
| Win
| align=center | 19–8–1
| Tim McKenzie
| Submission (brabo choke)
| BodogFIGHT: Costa Rica Combat
| 
| align=center | 1
| align=center | 0:13
| San José, Costa Rica
|
|-
| Win
| align=center | 18–8–1
| Aleksei Oleinik
| Decision (unanimous)
| BodogFIGHT: USA vs. Russia
| 
| align=center | 3
| align=center | 5:00
| Vancouver, British Columbia, Canada
|
|-
| Win
| align=center | 17–8–1
| Tim Credeur
| TKO (punches)
| BodogFIGHT: To the Brink of War
| 
| align=center | 1
| align=center | 2:18
| San José, Costa Rica
|
|-
| Loss
| align=center | 16–8–1
| Jeremy Horn
| Submission (armbar)
| UFC 60
| 
| align=center | 2
| align=center | 1:17
| Los Angeles, California, United States
|
|-
| Win
| align=center | 16–7–1
| Trevor Prangley
| Decision (unanimous)
| UFC Fight Night 4
| 
| align=center | 3
| align=center | 5:00
| Las Vegas, Nevada, United States
|
|-
| Loss
| align=center | 15–7–1
| Renato Sobral
| Submission (triangle choke)
| UFC 55
| 
| align=center | 2
| align=center | 1:20
| Uncasville, Connecticut, United States
| 
|-
| Win
| align=center | 15–6–1
| Tim Williams
| TKO (punches)
| SF 11: Rumble at the Rose Garden
| 
| align=center | 1
| align=center | 3:59
| Portland, Oregon, United States
|
|-
| Win
| align=center | 14–6–1
| Adam Ryan
| TKO (punches)
| Euphoria: USA vs World
| 
| align=center | 1
| align=center | 3:49
| Atlantic City, New Jersey, United States
|
|-
| Loss
| align=center | 13–6–1
| Terry Martin
| TKO (corner stoppage)
| XFO 4: International
| 
| align=center | 2
| align=center | 5:00
| McHenry, Illinois, United States
|
|-
| Win
| align=center | 13–5–1
| Alex Stiebling
| Decision (unanimous)
| WEC 12
| 
| align=center | 3
| align=center | 5:00
| Lemoore, California, United States
|
|-
| Loss
| align=center | 12–5–1
| Jeremy Horn
| Submission (guillotine choke)
| SF 6: Battleground in Reno
| 
| align=center | 2
| align=center | 2:35
| Reno, Nevada, United States
|
|-
| Loss
| align=center | 12–4–1
| Keiichiro Yamamiya
| Decision (majority)
| Pancrase: 2004 Neo-Blood Tournament Final
| 
| align=center | 3
| align=center | 5:00
| Tokyo, Japan
|
|-
| Loss
| align=center | 12–3–1
| Jeremy Horn
| TKO (cut)
| Extreme Challenge 57
| 
| align=center | 1
| align=center | 3:34
| Council Bluffs, Iowa, United States
|
|-
| Win
| align=center | 12–2–1
| Justin Bailey
| KO (flying knee)
| Rage on the River
| 
| align=center | 1
| align=center | 0:40
| Redding, California, United States
|
|-
| Win
| align=center | 11–2–1
| Arman Gambaryan
| Decision (unanimous)
| Euphoria: Russia vs USA
| 
| align=center | 3
| align=center | 5:00
| Atlantic City, New Jersey, United States
| 
|-
| Win
| align=center | 
| Homer Moore
| Decision (unanimous)
| ROTR 4.5: Proving Grounds
| 
| align=center | 2
| align=center | 5:00
| Hilo, Hawaii, United States
|
|-
| Win
| align=center | 9–2–1
| Greg Curnut
| TKO (submission to punches)
| FCFF: Rumble at the Roseland 10
| 
| align=center | 1
| align=center | 1:07
| Portland, Oregon, United States
|
|-
| Win
| align=center | 8–2–1
| Jason Lambert
| Decision (unanimous)
| Gladiator Challenge 20
| 
| style="text-align:center;" | 3
| style="text-align:center;" | 5:00
| Colusa, California, United States
| 
|-
| Loss
| align=center | 7–2–1
| Forrest Griffin
| Submission (triangle choke)
| IFC: Global Domination
| 
| align=center | 1
| align=center | 2:25
| Denver, Colorado, United States
|
|-
| Win
| align=center | 7–1–1
| Renato Sobral
| Decision
| Hitman Fighting 3
| 
| align=center | N/A
| align=center | N/A
| Santa Ana, California, United States
|
|-
| Draw
| align=center | 6–1–1
| Akihiro Gono
| Draw
| Pancrase: Hybrid 2
| 
| align=center | 2
| align=center | 5:00
| Osaka, Japan
|
|-
| Loss
| align=center | 6–1
| Trevor Prangley
| Technical Submission (armbar)
| XFA 5: Redemption
| 
| align=center | 1
| align=center | 2:49
| West Palm Beach, Florida, United States
|
|-
| Win
| align=center | 6–0
| Justin Hawes
| TKO (punches)
| UFCF: Rumble in Rochester
| 
| align=center | 2
| align=center | 4:26
| Rochester, Washington, United States
|
|-
| Win
| align=center | 5–0
| Jesse Ault
| Decision (unanimous)
| Real Fighting Championships 1: The Beginning
| 
| align=center | 3
| align=center | 5:00
| Las Vegas, Nevada, United States
|
|-
| Win
| align=center | 4–0
| Scott Shipman
| Submission (forearm choke)
| rowspan=2|Dangerzone 13: Caged Heat
| rowspan=2|
| align=center | 2
| align=center | 2:08
| rowspan=2|New Town, North Dakota, United States
| 
|-
| Win
| align=center | 3–0
| Jesse Ault
| Decision (unanimous)
| align=center | 2
| align=center | 5:00
| 
|-
| Win
| align=center | 2–0
| Jason Miller
| Decision (unanimous)
| HFP 1: Rumble on The Reservation
| 
| align=center | 2
| align=center | 5:00
| Anza, California, United States
|
|-
| Win
| align=center | 1–0
| Ben Hailey
| Decision (unanimous)
| Battle of Fort Vancouver
| 
| align=center | 1
| align=center | 7:00
| Vancouver, Washington, United States
|

Submission grappling record 
{| class="wikitable sortable" style="font-size:80%; text-align:left;"
|-
| colspan=8 style="text-align:center;" | 9 Matches, 3 Wins, 4 Losses, 2 Draws
|-
!  Result
!  Rec.
!  Opponent
!  Method
!  text-center| Event
!  Date
!  Division
!  Location
|-
| Loss ||align=center|3–4–2||  Craig Jones || Submission (heel hook) || rowspan=2|ADCC 2017 || rowspan=2|September 24, 2017 || Absolute ||rowspan=2|  Espoo, Finland
|-
| Win ||align=center|3–3–2||  Léo Vieira || Referee Decision || Superfight
|-
| Draw ||align=center|2–3–2||  Michael Bisping || Draw || UR Fight 2016 || March 20, 2016 || Superfight|| Phoenix, Arizona
|-
| Draw ||align=center|2–3–1||  Renato Sobral || Draw || Metamoris VI || May 9, 2015 || Superfight || Los Angeles, California
|-
| Loss ||align=center|2–3||  André Galvão || Submission (rear-naked choke) || Metamoris IV || August 9, 2014 || Superfight || Los Angeles, California
|-
| Loss ||align=center|2–2||  Alexandre Ferreira || N/A || rowspan=2|ADCC 2003 || rowspan=2|May 17, 2003 || rowspan=2|-99 kg ||rowspan=2| São Paulo, Brazil
|-
| Win ||align=center|2–1||  Beau Clark || N/A
|-
| Loss ||align=center|1–1||  Alexandre Ferreira || Submission (guillotine choke) || rowspan=2|ADCC 2001 || rowspan=2|April 11, 2001 || rowspan=2|-99 kg ||rowspan=2| Abu Dhabi, United Arab Emirates
|-
| Win ||align=center|1–0||  Stephan Potvin || N/A
|-

Pay-per-view bouts

See also 
 List of current Bellator fighters
 List of male mixed martial artists
 List of sportspeople sanctioned for doping offences

References

External links 
 
 
 Chael Sonnen profile at the National Wrestling Hall of Fame
 
 Chael Sonnen GFW Profile
Chael Sonnen on YouTube

1977 births
American athlete-politicians
American male mixed martial artists
American practitioners of Brazilian jiu-jitsu
People awarded a black belt in Brazilian jiu-jitsu
American money launderers
American podcasters
American politicians convicted of fraud
Oregon Republicans
American male sport wrestlers
American sportspeople in doping cases
American white-collar criminals
Doping cases in mixed martial arts
Finance fraud
Light heavyweight mixed martial artists
Living people
Middleweight mixed martial artists
Mixed martial artists utilizing collegiate wrestling
Mixed martial artists utilizing Greco-Roman wrestling
Mixed martial artists utilizing Brazilian jiu-jitsu
Mixed martial artists from Oregon
Oregon Ducks wrestlers
People from West Linn, Oregon
Sportspeople from the Portland metropolitan area
Oregon politicians convicted of crimes
Professional wrestling announcers
Wrestlers from Oregon
Catholics from Oregon
Ultimate Fighting Championship male fighters
Participants in American reality television series
The Apprentice (franchise) contestants